Sofkee is an unincorporated community in Bibb County, Georgia, United States. It is part of the Macon Metropolitan Statistical Area. The main road through Sofkee is US 129/SR 247 (Hawkinsville Road).

History
A post office called Sofkee was established in 1912, and remained in operation until 1930. The community derives its name from Tobesofkee Creek.

References

Unincorporated communities in Georgia (U.S. state)
Unincorporated communities in Bibb County, Georgia
Macon metropolitan area, Georgia